Suleiman Hussein Adamu is a Nigerian Engineer and the Minister, Nigerian Federal Ministry of Water Resources. He commissioned the Ogbia Regional Water Project in Otuoke, Bayelsa State. He was appointed the Minister of Water Resources by the President of the Federal Republic of Nigeria, President Muhammadu Buhari.

Early life and education 
Suleiman was born in Kaduna in 1963 and graduated from the Ahmadu Bello University, Kaduna before proceeding to the University of Reading in the United Kingdom.

Award and recognition 
In 2020, Suleiman Hussein Adamu was awarded the 2020 global Award for Outstanding Contribution to WaterAid by His Royal Highness, Prince Charles, the Prince of Wales.

References 

1963 births
Living people
Ahmadu Bello University alumni
Alumni of the University of Reading
People from Kaduna State
Federal ministers of Nigeria